Vexillum longispira is a species of sea snail, a marine gastropod mollusk, in the family Costellariidae, the ribbed miters.

References

External links
  Cernohorsky, Walter Oliver. The Mitridae of Fiji; The veliger vol. 8 (1965)

longispira
Gastropods described in 1874